Metodi Tasev Shatorov - Sharlo (January 10, 1897 – September 1944) was a Bulgarian Communist Party activist and also the temporary leader of the Regional Committee of Communists in Macedonia in 1940-1941. Like most left-wing politicians from Macedonia, during the 1930s he adopted the Resolution of the Comintern on the Macedonian question, about the recognition of a distinct Macedonian national identity. However, such Macedonian communist functionaries, originating from the Bulgarian Communist Party (BCP) and Internal Macedonian Revolutionary Organization (United) (IMRO (United)), never lost their strong pro-Bulgarian (Bulgarophile) sentiments.

Biography

Shatorov was born in January 10, 1897, in Prilep, then in the Manastir vilayet of the Ottoman Empire. He graduated from the local Bulgarian Exarchate's junior school in Prilep and afterwards from the Bulgarian men's high school in Bitola. He also attended the Bulgarian pedagogic school in Skopje in 1914-1915. In 1918 the Bulgarian Army withdrew from Vardar Macedonia and Serbia annexed the area. He immediately emigrated to Bulgaria, where he became a member of the BCP in 1920.  Furthermore, Sharlo was arrested for his participation in the September Uprising in 1923. In 1925 he became also a member of the IMRO (United) - de facto a BCP creation. As a significant party worker, he grew as a functionary of the Comintern and a member of the BCP Central Committee. He was imprisoned several times and emigrated to the Soviet Union for political reasons. During the Spanish Civil War Sharlo went to Paris as a coordinator of BCP. During World War II the Comintern sent him back to Vardar Macedonia (being then part of the Kingdom of Yugoslavia under the name 'Vardarska Banovina') to serve as a Secretary of the Macedonian Regional Committee of the Yugoslav Communist Party (YCP) since 1940. After the Bulgarian takeover of Vardarska Banovina in April 1941, the Vardar Macedonian communists fell in the sphere of influence of the BCP under Sharlo's leadership. The Macedonian Regional Committee refused to remain in contact with the YCP and linked up with BCP as soon as the invasion of Yugoslavia started. Sharlo refused to distribute the proclamation of the YCP which called for military action against the Bulgarians. He also became prominent with his anti-Serbian political views. The local committee of the YCP claimed that the Bulgarian army liberated the local population from the oppressive and despised Serbian bondage. Shatorov, a dedicated anti-fascist, was credited with the slogan "One people, one country, one party", by which he approved the Bulgarian invasion. For him not the Bulgarians, but the Serbs were the occupiers of Vardar Macedonia.

While the Bulgarian communists avoided organising mass armed uprising against the Bulgarian authorities in Vardar Macedonia, the Yugoslav communists insisted on an armed revolt. Upon the decision of the Comintern and Joseph Stalin himself the Macedonian communists were reattached to CPY. Sharlo's leadership was terminated, but the vestiges of his policy among part of the communist activists were preserved. Despite his expulsion, the new executive bodies of the Macedonian Regional Committees continued to share Shatorov's ideas until 1943. This policy changed since 1943 with the arrival of the Tito's envoy Montenegrin Serb Svetozar Vukmanović-Tempo. He began in earnest to organise armed resistance to the Bulgarian rule and sharply criticized Sharlo's pro-Bulgarian policy.

Consequently, for his actions Sharlo was expelled from the YCP and in the late 1941 he moved again to Sofia, where he began working as one of the Bulgarian resistance movement leaders (under the nickname 'Panayot'). He was among the most active organizers of the rescue of the Bulgarian Jews.

Sharlo was heavily wounded and died under unknown circumstances after September 5, 1944, when a battle between partisans and gendarmerie on Milevi Skali in the Western Rhodope mountains, between Septemvri and Velingrad occurred. As Shatorov was previously subjected to devastating criticism from the Yugoslav Communist Party, there are alleged suggestion that he was killed by Yugoslav communists' order as a politically inconvenient leader. This happened only several days before the Communist coup d'état of  September, 9 (backed by the Red Army) installed a new government of the Fatherland Front. As per the autopsy report, he died after 9 September, i.e. after the old regime's end, and until then he was not discovered neither by his comrades nor by the new authorities.

Shatorov's supporters in Vardar Macedonia called Sharlisti, were criticised by the YCP, and after WWII repressed for their anti-Yugoslav and pro-Bulgarian political positions. After the breakup of Yugoslavia and the fall of Communism he was partially rehabilitated in then Republic of Macedonia only in 2005.

Gallery

Footnotes

External links

"За тебе говори приказната"
Ефтим Гашев "Шарловизија"
Стефан Алексовски "Која е вистината за Шарло"
Кокан Стојчев "'Браварот' од Кумровец наредил, а Колишевски од 'Крагуевац' ја извршил задачата - смена на Шарло"
Владимир Јовановски "Шарло 'акробатот' и Лазо младоженецот"
"Од чии куршуми загина Шаторов?"
"Убийството на Методи Шаторов" 
"Националното дело на Методи Шаторов - Шарло"
"Влиянието на делото на Шаторов"
"Metodi Shatorov"

1897 births
1944 deaths
People from Prilep
People from Manastir vilayet
Bulgarian communists
Bulgarian resistance members
Bulgarian Comintern people
Guerrillas killed in action
Internal Macedonian Revolutionary Organization (United) members
Yugoslav communists
Yugoslav Partisans members
Deaths by firearm in Bulgaria
20th-century Bulgarian politicians
People murdered in Bulgaria